Brennabor Typ A was the designation given to a six-cylinder car introduced by the Brennabor company in 1927.   Successive versions appeared in subsequent years until the Typ As were replaced, by the Brennabor Juwel 6, for 1930.

In 1927 the Brennabor company introduced the 2.5-litre six-cylinder Brennabor Typ AL which complemented the Brennabor Typ R, hitherto Brennabor’s largest model, and so extended the manufacturer’s range up a level.

The Typ AL was powered by a 6-cylinder side-valve engine of 2.55 Litres, mounted ahead of the driver and delivering 45 hp at 3,300 rpm. Power was delivered to the rear wheels through a single plate dry clutch and a four-speed gear box controlled with a centrally positioned floor-mounted gear stick.

The car sat on a U-profile pressed steel chassis with rigid axles and semi-elliptical leaf springing. At this stage it was offered only as a four-door “Pullman-limousine” (large saloon/sedan). The mechanically linked foot brake operated directly on all four wheels, while the handbrake operated on the drive-shaft.

A year later, in 1928, the AL was joined by the Brennabor Typ AK which shared the engine and other mechanical components of the AL, but was shorter and lighter, and therefore faster.   The AK was available as a four-door sedan/saloon, a soft/open topped saloon/sedan or as a two-door full cabriolet.

Further extension of the range took place in 1928 with the arrival of the Brennabor Typ ASL and Brennabor Typ ASK.   These shared the dimensions and many mechanical elements with, respectively, the Typ AL and Typ AK but they featured a bored out version of the company’s six-cylinder engine which in this form had a capacity of 3,080 cc, giving rise to an increase in claimed power output from 45 to 55 hp and a corresponding increase of 5 km/h (3 mph) in the maximum speed.   Advertised fuel consumption was also increased by more than 15%.

In  1929 the range was rationalised.   The 2.5-litre models were delisted and the 3.1-litre models were replaced with the Brennabor Typ AFL and  Brennabor Typ AFK.   These cars differed little from their predecessors in terms of dimensions and mechanical components, with the notable exception of the gear box which now had only three ratios.   Body style were rationalised, the shorter Typ AFK being offered now only as a “cabrio-limousine” (soft/open topped saloon/sedan).

In addition, the prices of the six-cylinder Brennabors were significantly reduced in 1929.
By 1930, when the Typ A was replaced by the Juwel 6, approximately 10,000 Typ As had been produced.

Technical details

Sources 
 Werner Oswald: Deutsche Autos 1920–1945. Motorbuch Verlag Stuttgart, 10. Auflage (1996), 

Brennabor vehicles
Motorcycles introduced in the 1920s